Teton is an unincorporated community in Stanley County, in the U.S. state of South Dakota.

History
The community was named after the Teton Sioux Indian Tribe.

References

Unincorporated communities in Stanley County, South Dakota
Unincorporated communities in South Dakota